Bethania de Jesús Aburto Espinoza (born 5 February 1990) is a Nicaraguan footballer who plays as a goalkeeper for the Nicaragua women's national team.

Early life
Aburto was born in Corinto.

International career
Aburto capped for Nicaragua at senior level during two CONCACAF Women's Championship qualifications (2010 and 2018), three Central American and Caribbean Games editions (2010, 2014 and 2018) and the 2012 CONCACAF Women's Olympic Qualifying Tournament qualification.

References 

1990 births
Living people
People from Chinandega Department
Nicaraguan women's footballers
Women's association football goalkeepers
Nicaragua women's international footballers
Central American Games silver medalists for Nicaragua
Central American Games medalists in football